Jacob Adriaan de Wilde (7 January 1879 – 10 January 1956) was a Dutch politician of the defunct Anti-Revolutionary Party (ARP) now merged into the Christian Democratic Appeal (CDA) party and jurist.

De Wilde attended the Gymnasium Haganum in The Hague from June 1891 until June 1897 and applied at the Free University Amsterdam in June 1897 majoring in Law, Literature and Philology and obtaining Bachelor of Letters and Bachelor of Laws degrees in July 1901 before transferring to the University of Amsterdam the next year in July 1902 where he graduated with a Master of Laws degree in July 1905. De Wilde worked as a lawyer from September 1905 until May 1933 in Soest from September 1905 until February 1908 and in The Hague from February 1908 until May 1933. De Wilde also worked as editor of the newspapers Haagsche Courant and the Provinciale Zeeuwse Courant from April 1913 until August 1920 and editor-in-chief of the party newspaper De Rotterdammer from March 1914 until August 1920 and served as editor-in-chief of Haagsche Courant and the Provinciale Zeeuwse Courant from March 1916 until August 1920. De Wilde served on the Municipal Council of The Hage from September 1916 until September 1931 and served as an Alderman in The Hague from September 1919 until September 1931. De Wilde was elected as a Member of the House of Representatives after the election of 1918, taking office on 17 September 1918. After the election of 1933 De Wilde was appointed as Minister of the Interior in the Cabinet Colijn II, taking office on 26 May 1933. The Cabinet Colijn II fell just two year later on 23 July 1935 and continued to serve in a demissionary capacity until the cabinet formation of 1935 when it was replaced by the Cabinet Colijn III with De Wilde continuing as Minister of the Interior, taking office on 31 July 1935. After the election of 1937 De Wilde returned as a Member of the House of Representatives, taking office on 8 June 1937. Following the cabinet formation of 1937 De Wilde was appointment as Minister of Finance in the Cabinet Colijn IV, taking office on 24 June 1937. On 19 May 1939 De Wilde resigned after disagreeing with the cabinets decision to not implement a stronger austerity policy. De Wilde once more returned as Member of the House of Representatives after the resignation of Hendrik Botterweg, taking office on 19 September 1939.

On 10 May 1940 Nazi Germany invaded the Netherlands and the government fled to London to escape the German occupation. During World War II De Wilde continued to serve as a Member of the House of Representatives but in reality the de facto political influence of the House of Representatives was marginalized. On 30 June 1941 De Wilde was arrested and detained in Vught and was transferred to Sint-Michielsgestel on 1 December and was detained until on 7 May 1942. De Wilde also served retroactively as acting Chairman of the Anti-Revolutionary Party from 18 September 1944 until 5 May 1945 after Hendrikus Colijn had died in captivity in Ilmenau on 18 September 1944. Following the end of World War II Queen Wilhelmina ordered a Recall of Parliament and De Wilde remained a Member of the House of Representatives, taking office on 20 November 1945. De Wilde was elected as a Member of the Senate after the Senate election of 1948, he resigned as a Member of the House of Representatives the same day he was installed as a Member of the Senate, serving from 27 July 1948 until 15 July 1952.

Decorations

References

External links

Official
  Mr. J.A. de Wilde Parlement & Politiek
  Mr. J.A. de Wilde (ARP) Eerste Kamer der Staten-Generaal

 

 

1879 births
1956 deaths
Aldermen of The Hague
Anti-Revolutionary Party politicians
Chairmen of the Anti-Revolutionary Party
Dutch magazine editors
Dutch newspaper editors
Dutch people of World War II
Dutch political writers
Dutch prisoners of war in World War II
Dutch prosecutors
Grand Officers of the Order of Orange-Nassau
Knights of the Order of the Netherlands Lion
Members of the House of Representatives (Netherlands)
Members of the Senate (Netherlands)
Ministers of Finance of the Netherlands
Ministers of the Interior of the Netherlands
Municipal councillors of The Hague
People from Goes
Reformed Churches Christians from the Netherlands
University of Amsterdam alumni
Vrije Universiteit Amsterdam alumni
World War II civilian prisoners
World War II prisoners of war held by Germany
Writers from The Hague
20th-century Dutch civil servants
20th-century Dutch jurists
20th-century Dutch lawyers
20th-century Dutch male writers
20th-century Dutch politicians